Endothenia vasculigera is a species of moth of the family Tortricidae. It is found in the Democratic Republic of Congo.

References

Moths described in 1938
Endotheniini
Endemic fauna of the Democratic Republic of the Congo